Fábio Carbone (born September 4, 1980) is a Brazilian race car driver.

Racing career
Carbone began his career in karting at the age of nine and won the Brazilian national championship at 15 years of age, in 1995.

In 1999, he moved into Formula Chevrolet and finishing the Brazilian championship in vice, behind Felipe Massa. He finished the championship in third in the next year.

In 2001, he moved to Europe to compete in the Italian and Formula Renault Championship. He won three races and finished the series in third at once. In the same year, he participated in five races of the European Formula Renault Championship and took a pole position. Renault saw his activity and selected him to a driver of Renault Development Program.

Formula Three
In 2002, he competed in the British Formula 3 Championship and finished in sixth. In this year, he won the Masters F3 race.

In 2003, he moved to Formula 3 Euro Series of just establishment and finished in fifth. He won the race 2 of the Pau Grand Prix. And he took pole position in the Macau Grand Prix F3 race and runner-up in the race.

In 2004, once more, he moved to another Formula Three championship, the Japanese Championship in this time. And he returned to Euroseries in 2005 before re-returned to Japanese Championship in 2006.

Japan
Though he ran as practice driver for the A1 Team Brazil in the 2005–06 season, he went on to take an active part in Japan and competed in the Formula Nippon and Super GT in 2007.

He also participated in 1000km Suzuka in 2006 and finished in second.

Formula Renault 3.5 Series

Carbone competed in the Formula Renault 3.5 Series in 2008, driving for the Ultimate Signature team, with team-mates Claudio Cantelli and Esteban Guerrieri.  He won two consecutive races in 2008.

Return to Brazil 
Carbone resumed his sports career in 2011. He raced in the Brasileiro de Marcas as well as some races in Stock Car Brasil and Porsche GT3 Cup Brasil.

Racing record

Career summary

Complete Formula Renault 3.5 Series results 
(key) (Races in bold indicate pole position) (Races in italics indicate fastest lap)

Complete Super GT results

References

External links
Driver Database

1980 births
Living people
Brazilian racing drivers
Stock Car Brasil drivers
Formula Nippon drivers
Italian Formula Renault 2.0 drivers
Formula Renault Eurocup drivers
British Formula Three Championship drivers
Formula 3 Euro Series drivers
Japanese Formula 3 Championship drivers
Super GT drivers
World Series Formula V8 3.5 drivers
Nismo drivers
Nakajima Racing drivers
EuroInternational drivers
Signature Team drivers
Dandelion Racing drivers
Hitech Grand Prix drivers
Fortec Motorsport drivers